World War II was the first conflict to take place in the age of electronically mass distributed music.

Many people in the war had a pressing need to be able to listen to the radio and 78-rpm shellac records en masse. By 1940, 96.2% of Northeastern American urban households had radio. The lowest American demographic to embrace mass distributed music, Southern rural families, still had 1 radio for every two households.

Similar adoption rates of mass distribution of music occurred in Europe. During the Nazi rule, radio ownership in Germany rose from 4 to 16 million households. As the major powers entered the war, millions of citizens had home radio devices that did not exist in the First World War.

Therefore, World War II was a unique situation for music and its relationship to warfare. Never before was it possible for not only single songs but also single recordings of songs to be so widely distributed to the population. Never before had the number of listeners to a single performance (a recording or broadcast production) been so high. Also, never before had states had so much power to determine not only what songs were performed and listened to, but to control the recordings not allowing local people to alter the songs in their own performances. Though local people still sang and produced songs, this form of music faced serious new competition from centralized electronic distributed music.

German English song
"Lili Marlene" was the most popular song of World War II with both German and British forces. Based on a German poem, the song was recorded in both English and German versions. The poem was set to music in 1938 and was a hit with troops in the Afrika Korps. Mobile desert combat required a large number of radio units and the British troops in the North African Campaign started to enjoy the song so much that it was quickly translated into English. The song was used throughout the war as a propaganda tool.

American music

American troops had regular access to radio in all but the most difficult combat situations, and not only did soldiers know specific songs, but specific recordings. This gave a nature to American troops' music during WWII, not as many songs sung around a fire or while marching, but listened to between combat on Armed Forces Radio.
 "Amor" - Andy Russell with Al Sack & His Orchestra (1944)
 "Ac-Cent-Tchu-Ate The Positive" - Johnny Mercer (1944)
 "Bésame Mucho" - Andy Russell with Al Sack & His Orchestra
 "Be Careful, It's My Heart" - Composer: Irving Berlin - From: Movie Holiday Inn (1942)
 "Boogie Woogie Bugle Boy" - Andrews Sisters (1941)"
 "Comin' In on a Wing and a Prayer" - The Song Spinners
 "Der Fuehrer's Face" - Spike Jones and his City Slickers (1943)
 "Remember Pearl Harbor" - Sammy Kaye (1942)
 "Don't Fence Me In" - Bing Crosby and The Andrews Sisters (Cover)
 "Don't Get Around Much Anymore (Never No Lament)" - Duke Ellington & His Orchestra
 "Don't Sit Under The Apple Tree (With Anyone Else But Me)" - Composer: Lew Brown, Sam H. Stept, and Charlie Tobias (1942)
 "Ev'ry Time We Say Goodbye" - Composer: Cole Porter - From: musical Seven Lively Arts (1944)
 "G.I. Jive" - Johnny Mercer
 "I Don't Want To Walk Without You" - Harry James & His Orchestra Composer: Frank Loesser and Jule Styne - From: Movie Sweater Girl (1942), performed by Betty Jane Rhodes
 "I Wonder" - Louis Armstrong
 I'll Be Seeing You - The Ink Spots/Bing Crosby Words by Irving Kahal, music by Sammy Fain
 "I'll Get By (As Long As I Have You)" - Ink Spots
 "I'll Walk Alone" - Martha Tilton
 "It's Been A Long, Long Time" - Harry James & His Orchestra
 "Long Ago (And Far Away)" - Jo Stafford Composer: Ira Gershwin and Jerome Kern - From: musical Cover Girl (1944)
 "Kiss the Boys Goodbye" - Composer: Frank Loesser and Victor Schertzinger - From: movie Kiss the Boys Goodbye (1941)
 "Praise the Lord and Pass the Ammunition" - Composer: Frank Loesser (1942)
 "Sentimental Journey" - Les Brown & His Orchestra; Composer: Bud Green, Les Brown, and Ben Homer – (1944)
 "(There'll Be Bluebirds Over) The White Cliffs of Dover" - Jimmy Dorsey & His Orchestra (1942)
 "Till Then" - Mills Brothers
 "Waitin' For The Train To Come In" - Peggy Lee
 "What a Diff'rence a Day Made" - Andy Russell with Paul Weston & His Orchestra (1944)
 "When The Lights Go On Again (All Over The World)" - Vaughn Monroe & His Orchestra (1943)
 You'd Be So Nice To Come Home To - Composer: Cole Porter - From: musical Something to Shout About – (1943)
 "Yours" - Jimmy Dorsey & His Orchestra

In a nod to the special services and sacrifices the troops were making both overseas as well as domestically, many of these songs were specially re-recorded by their original artists for a Department of Defense musical and morale mission entitled V-Discs for the exclusive consumption by military personnel, similar to Armed Forces Radio.

As the United States was able to utilize the exponential growth of the technological age to compose music for various reasons, in Sounds of War: Music in the United States during World War II, it is made clear that music composed had various purposes, but more importantly, it mentions the tension that grew between institutions in order to find the right way to use music for U.S overall interest. Examples can be seen throughout the different types of songs being produced and publicized during this time. Songs like I'll Be Seeing You (1938) and Praise the Lord and Pass the Ammunition (1942) were songs that kept the citizens back in the U.S calm and hopeful for the return of their loved ones. On the other hand, these songs had other effects on the soldiers fighting abroad. For them, songs like these brought nostalgia and homesickness.

With the war brewing through the 1940s, other initiatives to help the soldiers continue fighting arose. With drafting numbers reaching close to 500,000, the Army along with other Defense institutions began to make military bands which would serve the purpose of boosting morale in the home front, while at the same time keeping patriotism and nationalism at an all-time high. The first patriotic war song of WWII in the U.S. was "God Bless America," written by Irving Berlin for a World War I wartime revue, but was withheld and later revised and used in World War II. There were many other patriotic wartime songs during this time such as, "A Nightingale Sang in Berkeley Square" by Glenn Miller and "Arms for the Love of America" by once again Irving Berlin in 1941.

After the successful incorporation of music into the war efforts, more was needed in order to keep hopes alive and stable both back in the U.S and in the Home Front. At various times music was used as a tool for battle in the war, whether it was to entertain or to recuperate the soldiers during the war., More importantly, was the impact that the music during the 1940s had on the people then and the effect that it continues to have now. Sounds of War: Music in the United States during World War II argues that music composed during the 1940s was unlike any other time of music because of its emphasis on making the listener feel like they are part of the war or if they are somewhere else. It adds that songs from World War II continue to be used today in order to remember those harsh times of war and to remind everyone of what the cost of liberty and freedom was. Some examples of this would include Aaron Copland's "Fanfare for the Common Man" (1942) and "Lincoln Portrait" (1942). These are still being played for presidential inaugurations and continue to have the effect of "loss for freedom".

During the 1940s the United States State Department also encouraged the mutual exchange of music on the radio with the neutral countries of Latin America in order to promote President Franklin Roosevelt's Good Neighbor policy and Pan-Americanism. Through the establishment of the Office of the Coordinator of Inter-American Affairs (OIAA), President Roosevelt utilized music as a form of cultural diplomacy in order to improve international relations with Latin America and forestall the spread of military hostilities throughout the Americas.  Professional musicians and composers from both North and South America were invited to concertize together on radio shows such as  Viva América in support of these efforts.  Included among these musicians were: Alfredo Antonini, Juan Arvizu, Nestor Mesta Chayres, Eva Garza, Elsa Miranda, Miguel Sandoval, John Serry Sr. and Terig Tucci.

In the years immediately after World War II, the United States Army continued to utilize music as form of cultural diplomacy amidst the ruins of western Europe. In 1952, the Seventh Army Symphony Orchestra was established under the musical direction of the composer Samuel Adler in an effort to demonstrate the shared musical heritage of the United States and the vanquished nations of Europe. Through a series of live musical performances and broadcasts over the Armed Forces Radio Services network, the orchestra successfully promoted mutual understanding and peace between the German and American people for a decade until 1962.

The number of concerts greatly increased along with the incorporation of women and African American musicians into military bands and groups. Whether women were incorporated because of sexual attraction or actual acceptance by the institutions is still not very clear, what is clear is that groups were now mixed sexes and some even mixed races in an era of sexism and racism. This goes to show that the role of music not only had effects in the international sphere but in the domestic as well.

Japanese music
 
 
 
 
 
 
 
 
 
  (A jazz song despite its title. Performed by Tadaharu Nakano and the Nakano Columbia Rhythm Boys.)

Music in the Democratic Allies
What is remarkable about the efforts in the UK and the USA during World War II is the degree to which the desires of most people were in line with that of the leaders. This meant the American and British government could count on popular music reflecting much of the same war aims that the government wanted. American people wanted a quick final victory over the Axis without compromise and the songs about a world after the war at peace with the boys coming home not only meet the personal desires of people but also reflected the goals of US government. Franklin Delano Roosevelt had always been motivated for a quick end to the war.

This unity of private and state desire likely gave the UK and the USA a degree of energy that allowed the nations to accomplish a great deal more at less human cost than the other major powers in the war. The mass suffering at the hands of the governments was not necessary as it was in Germany.

British popular music and the BBC
During the war, the BBC was forced to adapt, if only because British soldiers were listening to German radio stations to hear dance music. This adaptation did not commence without conflict. The BBC increased the amount of dance music played, but censorship was severe. The American hit "Coming in on a Wing and a Prayer," for example, was censored because of its almost blasphemous mix of religious words and a foxtrot melody. BBC heads were also worried about American-style crooners undermining the virility of British men.

The BBC tried hard to stick to the jaunty tone which they felt had helped to win the first world war - so George Formby and Gracie Fields were very much played on the radio

Britain did have a mass media which played popular music, much enjoyed by the Germans stationed in France and the Low Countries or flying over Britain. The most famous single performer was Vera Lynn who became known as "the forces' sweetheart".

Popular concert songs in Britain during the war included:
 Run Rabbit Run - Sung by Flanagan and Allen (1939) Words by Noel Gay & Ralph Butler. Music by Noel Gay.
 There'll Always Be An England (1939–40) Words by Hughie Charles. Music by Ross Parker. Sung by Vera Lynn.
 We'll Meet Again Words and Music by Ross Parker and Hughie Charles (1939)

This is perhaps the most famous wartime song with the lines:
We'll meet again
Don't know where
Don't know when
But I know we'll meet again some sunny day

 Vera Lynn's recording was memorably played during an apocalyptic scene in Dr. Strangelove; the Byrds covered it (to similarly ironic effect) on their first album.
 Kiss Me Goodnight, Sergeant-Major (1939), words by Don Pelosi, music by Art Noel
 We're Going to Hang out the Washing on the Siegfried Line (1939), words by Jimmy Kennedy, music by Michael Carr
 (There'll Be Bluebirds Over) The White Cliffs of Dover Words by Nat Burton and Music by Walter Kent (1941–42)
 When the Lights Go on Again Written by Eddie Seller, Sol Marcus, and Bennie Benjamin

The theme tune of the TV series Dad's Army, "Who do you think you are kidding, Mr Hitler?" does not date from the war, although it was intended as a gentle pastiche of wartime songs. With lyrics by Jimmy Perry and music by Perry and Derek Taverner, it was sung by one of Perry's childhood idols, wartime entertainer Bud Flanagan who died in 1968, soon after the first episode played.

Soviet music
 "The Sacred War"
 "Katyusha"
 "Blue Kerchief"
 "Dark Is the Night"
 "Farewell of Slavianka"
 "March of the Soviet Tankmen"
 "Three Tankists"
 "March of Stalin's Artillery"
 "March of the Defenders of Moscow"
 "Ogoniok" (Beacon)
 "Oy, Tumany" (Oh, the Fogs)
 "V lesu prifrontovom" (In a forest near the front)
 "Ždi Menya" (Await Me)
 Symphony No. 7 (Shostakovich)
 Category:World War II songs (in Russian)
 Category:Songs about World War II (in Russian)

German music
The Nazi government took a strong interest in promoting Germanic culture and music, which returned people to the folk culture of their remote ancestors while promoting the distribution of radio to transmit propaganda. The Nazi government had an obsession with controlling culture and promoting the culture it controlled. For this reason, the common people's tastes in music were much more secret. Many Germans used their new radios to listen to the jazz music hated by Hitler but loved all over the world.

In art, this attack came after expressionism, impressionism, and all forms of modernism. Forms of music targeted included jazz as well as the music of many of the more dissonant modern classical composers, including that of Igor Stravinsky, Paul Hindemith, and Arnold Schoenberg. Hindemith was one of many composers who fled the Third Reich as a result of musical persecution (as well as racial persecution, since Hindemith's wife, was part Jewish). Modern composers who took a more conventional approach to music, however, were welcomed by the Third Reich; Carl Orff and Richard Strauss, for example, were able to stay in the country during the Nazi period.

Also, a subtle factor of history makes gaining a reliable picture of the music of Germany more difficult than among the Allies. World War II in the English speaking world is usually remembered as a great triumph and the music is often performed with a sense of pride. Therefore, over time the collective consciousness of this period's music has become stronger. In Germany, World War II is generally seen as a shameful period; it would be difficult to imagine a band playing 'all the old favourites' of World War II in a public place.

Popular music is tied with nostalgia and collective memory. Though a historian can find samples of music that were played on the radio or can collect soldiers' songs from a period, ranking the subjective meaning and value assigned to a song by the people of that period will be greatly impacted by those subjects' later opinion of that music.

For example, it is known that many Germans enjoyed American jazz, and it is also known that Germans sang songs in Nazi sponsored events, but it would be difficult to determine the relative popularity of this music in the current context of shame concerning the war.

Therefore, the best that can be understood about German Music during the war is the official Nazi government policy, the level of enforcement, and some notion of the diversity of other music listened to, but as the losers in the war German Music and Nazi songs from World War II has not been assigned the high heroic status of American and British popular music.  As the music itself goes, however, it is considered by many as being above the level of the latter, which is also true of Fascist Italian music of the time.

Approved and unapproved German music
The Nazis were dedicated to the concept that German Culture was the greatest in history, but, as with all parts of art, Hitler took an interest in suppressing the work of all those he considered "unfit" while promoting certain composers as proper Germans. All musicians were required to join the Reichsmusikkammer, or "Reich Music Chamber", part of the Reich Chamber of Culture founded by Joseph Goebbels in 1933. Membership required a so-called Aryan certificate, meaning that Jewish musicians could no longer work.

Along with exhibitions of "degenerate art" (entartete Kunst) the Nazi government identified certain music, composers and performers as entartete Musik. Designation into this category was based upon the race, ethnicity, and political orientation of the composers and performers in question. The works of Jewish classical composers were banned, including those of Gustav Mahler, Felix Mendelssohn, Arnold Schoenberg, George Gershwin and Claude Debussy (who had a Jewish wife). The popular music of Irving Berlin (also Jewish) was completely banned. 

In 1938 Nazi Germany passed an official law on Jazz music. Not surprisingly it deals with the racial nature of the music and makes laws based on racial theories. Jazz was "Negroid"; It posed a threat to European higher culture, and was therefore forbidden except in the case of scientific study.

Music permitted under the Nazis
The Reichsmusikkammer promoted classical music by German composers such as Beethoven and Wagner, as well as Austrians such as Mozart. Military music was also promoted, but lighter, non-political music was a source of escapism for many. The , or "Request Concert for the Armed Forces", was a radio program broadcast from Berlin. The subject of a 1940 film, it consisted of live music requested by soldiers. Connecting the military to the home front and vice versa, contributed to the Volksgemeinschaft, the Nazi concept of a "people's community".

Degrees of censorship varied, and the Germans were likely more concerned with the war than styles of music. But as the war went poorly the objectives of the government moved from building a perfect German state to keeping the population in line, and the relative importance of morale-raising songs would have increased.

Popular songs were officially encouraged during the war including:
 "Berlin bleibt doch Berlin!" (Berlin is still Berlin) (words Bruno Balz, music Will Meisel) was popular with Joseph Goebbels near the fall of Berlin.
 "Erika", a marching song about a soldier who misses his fiancée, does not have political lyrics, but its composer, Herms Niel, had joined the Nazi Party in 1934.

Goebbels commissioned a swing band called "Charlie and His Orchestra" which existed for supplying propaganda to British and American troops over the radio. Popular tunes were sung in English with Nazi propaganda. The musicians were competent (they were spoofing highly-polished Big Band music). As an example, the singers would twist a hit such as Bob Hope's "Thanks for the Memory" with a taunt to English-speaking soldiers about the fall of Singapore, rhyming "Singapore" with "we don't go there anymore".

Polish music

There were specific songs of Polish resistance, Polish Armed Forces in the West and Polish Armed Forces in the East. These included Siekiera, motyka, the most popular song in occupied Poland; "Rozszumiały się wierzby płaczące" - a song associated with the Polish partisans; Czerwone maki na Monte Cassino - a song connected with the Polish Armed Forces in the West; Oka, a favourite song of the Polish Armed Forces in the East, and Marsz Gwardii Ludowej - a song also known as Partisans' Song anthem of GL.

Propaganda against the enemy
They played a few American records first. I don't remember everything she said. She said, "Your wives and girlfriends are probably home in a nice warm building, dancing with some other men. You're over here in the cold." It was cold and it was snowing.
Dent Wheeler on Axis Sally during the battle of the Bulge

"There is no 'Tokyo Rose'; the name is strictly a GI invention. The name has been applied to at least two lilting Japanese voices on the Japanese radio. ... Government monitors listening in 24 hours a day have never heard the words 'Tokyo Rose' over a Japanese-controlled Far Eastern radio."

During World War II, often cut off troops or isolated outposts found themselves exposed in the radio range of the enemy, which used popular music as a means to attract listeners and then provide propaganda messages.

This type of propaganda was performed by both sides and is some of the earliest mass psych-ops. Often the propagandist was listened to by the other sides, and there is little evidence that these had any impact, except that the Axis participants were often detained and if originally from allied countries prosecuted, while Allied broadcasters were seen as legitimate in Allied countries. Again it shows the way music is understood in the context of World War II is from the winners' point of view, whereas Tokyo Rose (Iva Ikuko Toguri D'Aquino) and Axis Sally (Mildred Gillars) faced years of persecution after the war.
England executed Lord Haw Haw (William Joyce) for treason, in 1946. Again there can really be little in the way of an objective history of music in World War II. The historical context since the war, the revelations of the evils of the Axis regimes, and the ultimate victory of the consumer society foretold in the songs of the allies impose a context upon the events like viewing a star through the lens of a telescope.

Songs, compositions and others written after the war
 Threnody to the Victims of Hiroshima, by Krzysztof Penderecki in 1960
 From Here to Eternity by George Duning and Morris Stoloff was nominated for an Academy Award for best musical score.
 The Hiroshima Symphony, by Erkki Aaltonen in 1949
 A Survivor from Warsaw, by Arnold Schoenberg describes the horrors of the Warsaw Ghetto Uprising.
 On The Nameless Height
 Sink the Bismark (sic, later corrected to "Sink the Bismarck"), a 1960 song by Johnny Horton about the sinking of that battleship in 1941.
 Cabaret - Musical produced and directed by Hal Prince in 1966, narrates the Nazi Party ascent to power, featuring a song expressing Nazi ideology "Tomorrow Belongs to Me".
 Mel Brooks' The Producers is famous for perhaps the strangest song about World War II, "Springtime for Hitler".

See also
 Music and political warfare
 Interpretive communities

Notes

References
 "The Songs that Fought the War: Popular Music and the Home Front, 1939–1945" By John Bush Jones
 "God Bless America: Tin Pan Alley Goes to War" By Kathleen E.R. Smith
 Aden, R. C., Rahoi, R. L., Beck, C. S. (1995) "'Dreams Are Born on Places Like This': The Process of Interpretive Community Formation at the Field of Dreams Site'"  Communication Quarterly (Vol. 43). (Pg 368–38
 "The Music of World War II: War Songs and Their Stories," Third Edition (2019) by Sheldon Winkler, Merriam Press, Hoosick Falls, New York

Further reading
 Ament, Suzanne. Sing to Victory: The Role of Popular Song in the Soviet Union During World War II. Ann Arbor, Mich.: UMI Dissertation Services, 1997. 
 Baade, Christina L. Victory Through Harmony: The BBC and Popular Music in World War II. Oxford: Oxford University Press, 2012.  
 Beeny, Martyn. Music Worth Fighting For: The Role of American Popular Music in the United States and the United Kingdom During World War II. University of Kent, 2011. 
 Bolden, Tonya. Take-Off!: American All-Girl Bands During WW II. New York: Knopf, 2007.  
 Devers, Deanna. The Use of Music for Morale Sustaining and Propaganda Purposes in Australia During World War II. Thesis (M. Mus.)--University of Melbourne, 1995. 
 Fauser, Annegret. Sounds of War: Music in the United States During World War II. New York: Oxford University Press, 2013.  
 Helbig, Otto Henry. A History of Music in the U.S. Armed Forces During World War II. Philadelphia: M. W. Lads, 1966. 
 Henderson, Hamish. Ballads of World War II. Glasgow: Privately printed by the Lili Marleen Club of Glasgow, 1950. 
 I'll Be Seeing You ...: Songs of World War II. Essex, England: EMI Music Pub, 1988.  
 Leitch, Michael, Peter J. Foss, and Ann Munday.  Great Songs of World War II: With the Home Front in Pictures. London: Wise Publications, 1975.  
 Sforza, John. Swing It!: The Andrews Sisters Story. Lexington, KY.: University Press of Kentucky, 2000.  
 Simmonds, Rae Nichols. The Use of Music As a Political Tool by the United States During World War II. Thesis (Ph.D.)--Walden University, 1994. 
 Sullivan, Jill M. Bands of Sisters: U.S. Women's Military Bands During World War II. Lanham, MD.: Scarecrow Press, 2011.  
 Winkler, Sheldon. The Music of World War II: War Songs and Their Stories: Merriam Pr, 2019. .

External links
 World ORT: Music and the Holocaust Politics, propaganda, resistance, exile and responses.
 http://www.fordham.edu/halsall/mod/ww2-music-uk.html
 https://www.pbs.org/wgbh/amex/bulge/sfeature/sf_dispatch_dw.html
 http://fcit.usf.edu/HOLOCAUST/arts/musDegen.htm
 http://fcit.usf.edu/HOLOCAUST/arts/musReich.htm
 http://www.remember.org/educate/art.html
 Gerard McBurney on The Music of World War II, a lecture recorded at the Pritzker Military Museum & Library
 http://www.bejo.co.uk/bejo/html/alblads.htm 

 
1940s in music
World War II and the media
Propaganda songs